Barry Irving (born 31 December 1979 in Sevenoaks, England) is an English born former Scotland 'A' international rugby union player. He plays at Fly-half.

Irving qualifies for Scotland as his father was born near Canonbie in Dumfrieshire. He was capped by Scotland A against New Zealand in 2001, confirming his Scottish nationality. He was called up for the full Senior squad in 2000 by Ian McGeechan but not used.

He started playing rugby for his local club Sevenoaks but in season 1998-99 he joined London Scottish. He made a try scoring debut for London Scottish against Saracens, four days before his nineteenth birthday.

He joined Glasgow at the start of the 1999-2000 season. Unfortunately he became blighted with injury and had very few run outs with the Glasgow side. He left Glasgow Warriors at the end of the 2002-03 season to sign for French side Tarbes who play in the French Pro D2 league. He played 22 matches for the French club but left them after one season.

He then signed for Italian club Amatori Catania. In season 2005-06 he was nominated for Player of the Year in Italy.

He later played for Rugby Parma from 2007-08 season to 2010.

References

External links
ESPN biography
Italian renaissance

1979 births
Living people
Scottish rugby union players
Glasgow Warriors players
Rugby union players from Sevenoaks
Scotland 'A' international rugby union players
Rugby union fly-halves